Waseem Tajbhay (born 31 January 1993) is a Botswana cricketer. He played in the 2015 ICC World Cricket League Division Six tournament. In October 2018, he represented Botswana in the Southern sub region group in the 2018–19 ICC World Twenty20 Africa Qualifier tournament.

References

External links
 

1993 births
Living people
Botswana cricketers
Cricketers from Johannesburg
South African emigrants to Botswana